Claus Møller Jakobsen (born 24 September 1976) is a Retired Danish former professional handballer and current sports commentator for TV2.

Career
Møller Jakobsen began his professional handball career in Skjern Håndbold. He was later signed by Spanish clubs BM Ciudad Real. He won EHF Champions League with the club in 2006. He later continued his career in Portland San Antonio. In 2009, he returned to Denmark to play for Skjern Håndbold. He won EHF Champions League with Ciudad Real in 2006.

He played his first national game on September 23, 1998, and has scored 149 goals in 121 games.

Post-playing career
After ending his active handball career, Møller Jakobsen has worked as a sports commentator for TV2.

Personal life
Møller Jakobsen was born in Ringkøbing. He has been in a relationship with the journalist and businesswoman Andrea Elisabeth Rudolphs since 2012 and they married at Frederiksberg Church in January 2017. They have two children together and Møller Jakobsen has two children from a previous marriage while Rudolph has a daughter from a previous relationship. They live in the Frederiksberg district of Copenhagen and have a second home in Aarhus.

Honours
EHF Champions League:
: 2006
EHF Men's Champions Trophy:
: 2005, 2006
ASOBAL Cup:
: 2005, 2006
Supercopa ASOBAL:
: 2005

References 

 Claus Møller Jakobsen at Skjern Håndbold 
 Player info at Danish Handball Federation

External links 
 

1976 births
Living people
Danish male handball players
Liga ASOBAL players
CB Ademar León players
SDC San Antonio players
BM Ciudad Real players
Danish expatriate sportspeople in Spain
People from Ringkøbing-Skjern Municipality
Sportspeople from the Central Denmark Region